Syntaxin-binding protein 2 is a protein that in humans is encoded by the STXBP2 gene.

References

Further reading

External links 
 PDBe-KB provides an overview of all the structure information available in the PDB for Human Syntaxin-binding protein 2